Patricia Jorge (May 17, 1970) is a Portuguese rhythmic gymnast.

Patricia Jorge competed for Portugal in the rhythmic gymnastics individual all-around competition at the 1988 Summer Olympics in Seoul. There she was 30th in the preliminary (qualification) round and did not advance to the final.

References

External links 
 
 

1970 births
Living people
Portuguese rhythmic gymnasts
Gymnasts at the 1988 Summer Olympics
Olympic gymnasts of Portugal